Przychody  is a village in the administrative district of Gmina Międzyrzec Podlaski, within Biała Podlaska County, Lublin Voivodeship, in eastern Poland.

The village has an approximate population of 530.

References

Villages in Biała Podlaska County